The 2009 Atlantic Coast Conference men's basketball tournament took place from March 12–15 at the Georgia Dome in Atlanta. The tournament was broadcast on the ESPN family of networks, along with Raycom Sports in the ACC footprint.

The championship game matched Duke against Florida State, who made their first appearance in the ACC championship game since joining the league in 1992. Duke won 79–69 for their 8th conference title in 11 years.

Schedule

Seeding 
Teams were seeded based on the final regular-season standings, with ties broken under an ACC policy.

Wake Forest and Duke split their regular-season games, each winning one. Wake Forest was awarded the second seed for its better record against top-seeded North Carolina: Wake won its only game, while Duke lost both games.

By finishing fourth in the conference, Florida State joined North Carolina, Duke and Wake Forest as teams that received a first-round bye in the tournament. It was the first time that the Seminoles had earned a bye since joining the conference in time for the 1991-92 season.

Clemson received the fifth seed because it beat Boston College in their only meeting.

The three-way tie among Maryland, Virginia Tech, and Miami was broken based on the record of games played among the three teams. Maryland received the seventh seed for having the best winning percentage (2–1), Virginia Tech received the eighth seed (1–1), and Miami received the ninth seed (1–2).

Bracket

Awards and honors 
Tournament MVP
 Jon Scheyer - Duke
All-Tournament Team

First Team
 Jon Scheyer - Duke
 Toney Douglas - Florida State
 Kyle Singler - Duke
 Tyler Hansbrough - North Carolina
 Gerald Henderson - Duke

Second Team
 Solomon Alabi - Florida State
 Wayne Ellington - North Carolina
 Eric Hayes - Maryland
 Greivis Vasquez - Maryland
 Lewis Clinch - Georgia Tech

References 

Tournament
ACC men's basketball tournament
College basketball tournaments in Georgia (U.S. state)
Basketball competitions in Atlanta
ACC men's basketball tournament
ACC men's basketball tournament
2009 in Atlanta